was a Japanese Shinto priest of the Sengoku period. He was a seminal figure in the evolution of a coherent descriptive and interpretive schema of Shinto ritual and mythology.

Career
Kanetomo progressed gradually through the ranks of the Imperial offices in the Jingi-kan (Department of Shinto Affairs), which was one of the Imperial bureaucracies which were set up under the  ritsuryō system in the 8th century.

1511 (Eishō 8, 2nd month): When Kanetomo died at the age of 77, his passing was considered a significant event in the chronicles of the Imperial history of Japan.

Yoshida Shinto
The early period Shinto school founded by Kanetomo was called Genpon-Sōgen Shinto ("Shinto of the Original Founder"), also known as Yuiitsu Shintō ("Only one Shintō").  Prior to Kanetomo, the understanding and practice of Shinto was intermingled with Buddhism.  Sanetomo invested a lifetime in a process of disentangling what were thereafter construed as the two distinct entities.

Inverted honji suijaku

The term honji suijaku expresses a Japanese Buddhist theory according to which a perceived Shinto kami is the manifestation of a Buddhist god.  This theory proposed and presumed that the resulting dual entity would necessarily have a fundamental Buddhist core, and that any Shinto aspect was secondary.

In the late Kamakura period, a counter-theory arose which also began with the notion of such dual entities; however, the counter-theorists construed that the kami side was primary and the Buddhist one was secondary.  This came to be known as the Inverted honji suijaku .

Kanetomo was influenced by these ideas and brought them further. He proposed to set aside the conceptual theories of such entities.

Up through the end of the Edo period, Kanetomo's followers and the Yoshida Shrine were granted the right to award ranks to all shrines and priests except for those associated with the Imperial family.

See also
 Shinto sects and schools
 Kunitokotachi

Notes

References
 Breen, John and Mark Teeuwen. (2000).  Shinto in History: Ways of the Kami. Honolulu: University of Hawaii Press. ; 
 Scheid, Bernhard. (2001). Der eine und einzige Weg der Götter: Yoshida Kanetomo und die Erfindung des Shinto. Vienna: Verlag der Österreichischen Akademie der Wissenschaften. ; 
 Titsingh, Isaac. (1834).  Annales des empereurs du Japon (Nihon Odai Ichiran).  Paris: Royal Asiatic Society, Oriental Translation Fund of Great Britain and Ireland.

External links
 Kokugakuin University, Encyclopedia of Shinto,  "Yoshida Kanetomo"

Kannushi
1435 births
1511 deaths
15th-century Japanese historians
16th-century Japanese historians
15th-century theologians
16th-century theologians
15th-century religious leaders
16th-century religious leaders
16th-century Japanese philosophers